Stephan Ludwig Roth (24 November 1796 – 11 May 1849) was a Transylvanian Saxon intellectual, teacher, pedagogue and Lutheran pastor.

Early life
Stephan Ludwig Roth was born in Mediasch (Principality of Transylvania, part of the Austrian Empire), in the family of Marie Elisabeth Roth (born Gunesch) and Gottlieb Roth, the rector of the Mediasch Gymnasium. After studying in Mediasch, Hermannstadt (Sibiu) and at the University of Tübingen, Roth in 1818 pursued his interest in the science of teaching by travelling to Switzerland to gather experience from Johann Heinrich Pestalozzi's projects in Yverdon-les-Bains. He became a collaborator of Pestalozzi, published Der Sprachunterricht (a work on language learning) and finished a doctorate in philosophy at Tübingen (1820).

Returning to Transylvania, Roth followed in the footsteps of his father as head of the Mediasch Gymnasium from 1831 and became a pastor in 1837.

Political career
In the debates raised by the Transylvanian Diet in 1841, he proposed that laws should be published in Latin, Hungarian and German. He thought that the Diet could keep using Hungarian by tradition but that the public administration should communicate with the people simultaneously in Hungarian, German and Romanian. He considered that making Romanian as well an official language in the region would point out its ascendence over the others and its lingua franca status in the ethnical composition of the country. He publicised the idea in his 1842 work: Der Sprachkampf in Siebenbürgen: 

He was against cultural assimilation of Romanians, but Roth had always argued that the Saxon element in Transylvania could be strengthened by encouraging new German colonists to move in.

Roth further irritated Hungarian sensibilities by rejecting any form of union between Transylvania and Hungary. He initially supporting in the March of 1848 but was dissatisfied of lack of guarantees of ethnic rights. He tried instead to build a bridge between Saxons and Romanians. Thus, he attended on 15 May the first ethnic Romanian gathering at Câmpia Libertății (near Blasendorf (Blaj) see ) and wrote about it in the local press. His articles showed full support for the movement and highlighted Avram Iancu's contribution to the cause.

With the outbreak of the violent clashes between Imperial and Hungarian troops in October 1848, Roth became a member of the Hermannstadt Pacification Committee and commissioner for Saxon villages in Nagy-Küküllő (in November), as well as the administrator de facto of the respective county.

With the Hungarian victories in January 1849 came the end of local government structures. General Józef Bem offered the administrators amnesty, and Roth retired to Muzsna. However, in February, Lajos Kossuth set up military tribunals with László Csányi, the government commissioner of Transylvania in which the pre-amnesty cases were trialed, backed by a parliamentary decree. On 21 April 1849, on orders of Csányi, Roth was arrested in his seat, under the following charges:

Execution
Roth expressly prohibited the local peasants to exert violence in his defence against the authorities. He was brought to Kolozsvár. On 11 May 1849, less than one month after Bem's amnesty has been cancelled, he was court-martialed for high treason against Hungary and was swiftly executed. He wrote to his children before his death that "dead or alive I've never been the enemy of the Hungarian nation. Believe this to me, a dying person in the very moment when all mendacity will cease to exist". Kossuth regarded the death penalty as a mistake, and Bem argued that if he had known about the sentence in time, he would have prevented the execution.

References

External links
"Stephan Ludwig Roth" at Mediaș City Hall
Ballade von dem sächsischen Pfarrer Stephan Ludwig Roth
ohio.edu

19th-century Lutheran clergy
Austrian educational theorists
Executed politicians
People executed by Hungary by firing squad
People of the Revolutions of 1848
Transylvanian Saxon people
People from Mediaș
1796 births
1849 deaths
Romanian Lutheran clergy